Pseudacraea imerina is a butterfly in the family Nymphalidae. It is found on Madagascar and the Comoros.

Description
. 
glaucina group -the only species of this group differs very considerably from all others and is quite isolated. 
P. glaucina Guen. Forewing black with two large green spots at the base of cellules 1 b and 2; cell short, green with three black spots at the anterior margin; midway between the cell and the apex of the wing 5 small, free green spots in cellules 3-6 and 9, arranged in a curve; small greenish submarginal dots. Hindwing unicolorous black above, with a triangular chalk-white spot at the costal margin in cellule 7 and very small whitish submarginal dots; beneath dark grey, at the distal margin blackish and at the hindmargin yellowish white to beyond the middle. Madagascar; rare.

Subspecies
Pseudacraea imerina imerina (southern and eastern Madagascar)
Pseudacraea imerina anjouana Collins, 1991 (Comoro Islands: Anjouan)

Biology
The habitat consists of forests.

Gallery

References

Butterflies described in 1865
Limenitidinae
Butterflies of Africa
Taxa named by William Chapman Hewitson